Giuseppe Manfreda (born 4 January 1969) is a retired Swiss football striker.

References

1969 births
Living people
Swiss men's footballers
FC Lugano players
FC Sion players
Neuchâtel Xamax FCS players
FC Locarno players
Treviso F.B.C. 1993 players
U.S. Livorno 1915 players
AC Bellinzona players
FC Chiasso players
Association football forwards
Swiss Super League players